Jos South is a Local Government Area in Plateau State, Nigeria. It houses the Plateau State new Government house which includes the Office of the Executive Governor and other government house administrative offices and departments including Plateau State Information and Communication Technology Development Agency in Rayfield and can thus be described as the de facto capital of Plateau state.

It has an area of 510 km and a population of 306,716 at the 2006 census. It is the second  most  populated Local Government Area in the state after Jos-North.

The postal code of the area is 930.

References

Local Government Areas in Plateau State